Florence Akiiki Asiimwe is a Ugandan politician, author, and lecturer. On January 14, 2021, she was elected as the representative of parliament for Masindi District in the 11th Parliament of Uganda. She is affiliated to the National Resistance Movement party which has been the ruling party since 1986.

Career and education 
Asiimwe holds a PhD in sociology from the University of Cape Town and a Master of Arts in development studies from the International Institute of Social Studies from The Hague, Netherlands. She worked as a senior lecturer at the Department of Sociology at Makerere University, a part-time lecturer at the University of the Western Cape, and a visiting scholar Kyoto University. Asiimwe has published books titled Community Mobilisation Skills in 2007 and The Untold Stories: Gender and Homeownership in Urban Uganda in 2011.

During the 2021 Ugandan general election on January 14, 2021, she was elected as the representative of parliament for Masindi District in the 11th Parliament of Uganda.

References 

1980 births
Living people
Ugandan politicians
National Resistance Movement politicians
20th-century Ugandan women
21st-century Ugandan politicians